Vinayakrao Kishanrao Jadhav Patil is an Bharatiya Janata Party member of the 13th Maharashtra Legislative Assembly. He represents the Ahmadpur Assembly Constituency.

Personal life

Political career

Positions held

See also 
• Ahmedpur (Vidhan Sabha constituency)

References

Year of birth missing (living people)
Living people
Maharashtra MLAs 2014–2019
Independent politicians in India
People from Latur district
Marathi politicians
Bharatiya Janata Party politicians from Maharashtra